The 2013 Tour of Qatar was the twelfth edition of the Tour of Qatar cycling stage race. It was rated as a 2.HC event on the UCI Asia Tour, and was held between 3 and 8 February 2013, in Qatar.

The race was won by Britain's Mark Cavendish, of the  team, winning the final four stages to take the victory. Cavendish's winning margin over runner-up Brent Bookwalter – the winners of the team time trial stage – was 25 seconds, and Brookwalter's teammate Taylor Phinney completed the podium, one second behind Brookwalter and 26 seconds down on Cavendish. In the race's other classifications, Cavendish also won the points classification, Phinney won the white jersey for the youth classification, by placing third overall in the general classification, and  finished at the head of the teams classification.

Teams
Eighteen teams competed in the 2013 Tour of Qatar. These included twelve UCI ProTour teams, five UCI Professional Continental teams, and a national team representing Japan.

The teams that participated in the race were:

Japan (national team)

Race overview

Stages

Stage 1
3 February 2013 – Katara Cultural Village to Dukhan Beach,

Stage 2
4 February 2013 – Al Rufaa Street,  team time trial (TTT)

Stage 3
5 February 2013 – Al Wakra to Mesaieed,

Stage 4
6 February 2013 – Camel Race Track to Madinat ash Shamal,

Stage 5
7 February 2013 – Al Zubara Fort to Al Khor Corniche,

Stage 6
8 February 2013 – Sealine Beach Resort to Doha Corniche,

Classification leadership

References

External links

Tour of Qatar
Tour of Qatar
2013